Ryan Johnson (born July 24, 2001) is an American collegiate ice hockey defenseman for the University of Minnesota of the Big Ten Conference (B1G). Johnson was drafted in the first round, 31st overall by the Buffalo Sabres in the 2019 NHL Entry Draft.

His father is former NHL forward Craig Johnson.

Playing career
Johnson was drafted 31st overall by the Buffalo Sabres in the first round of the 2019 NHL Entry Draft.

Personal life
Johnson's father is former NHL forward Craig Johnson who was a draft pick of the St. Louis Blues in the 1990 NHL Entry Draft and played 557 games in the NHL for the St. Louis Blues, LA Kings, Toronto Maple Leafs, Washington Capitals and the Mighty Ducks of Anaheim.

Career statistics

Regular season and playoffs

International

Awards and honors

References

External links
 

2001 births
Living people
American men's ice hockey defensemen
Buffalo Sabres draft picks
Ice hockey players from California
Minnesota Golden Gophers men's ice hockey players
National Hockey League first-round draft picks
Sioux Falls Stampede players
Sportspeople from Irvine, California